The discography of The Kelly Family, a European pop music group of Irish, American, Spanish and German heritage, consists of 22 studio albums, four of them being holiday albums, five live albums, seven compilation albums, two extended plays and 57 singles, seven of them being Double A-Side singles. Since the late 1970s, the family have released more than 21 studio albums and 43 singles on Universal Music, Polydor, their own record company Kel-Life Records and a number of smaller labels, the most successful being Over the Hump and Almost Heaven and its first singles "An Angel" and "I Can't Help Myself".

Since the late 1990s, the lineup of the band has seen changes during different recording and touring phases, caused by family reasons, solo activities or other side projects. Altogether, The Kelly Family has sold more than 20 million records around the world, including 54 gold and platinum-certified albums.

Albums

Studio albums

Holiday albums

Live albums

Compilations

Extended plays

Box sets

Singles

Promotional singles
 1994: Cassette Sampler (MC)
 1995: Quisiera ser un Ángel (MC)
 1995: The Kelly Family canta Quisiera ser un Ángel y Santa Maria en Español (MC)
 1995: Ares Qui (MC)
 1999: Ein Herz Für Kinder Medley (CD, MC)
 1999: Mela, Mela Nutella (CD, Vinyl)
 2017: Good Neighbor (Digital download)
 2017: Brothers and Sisters (Digital download)
 2017: Please Don't Go – Live (Digital download)

The 1994 single An Angel bears a remarkable similarity to Lynne Hamilton's 1979 hit "On The Inside" https://en.wikipedia.org/wiki/On_the_Inside_(song)

Solo recordings

References

External links
KellyFamily.de — official site
German Fanpage of the Kelly Family members incl. detailed discography

Discographies of American artists